Italy competed at the 1984 Summer Paralympics in Stoke Mandeville, Great Britain and New York City, United States. 61 competitors from Italy won 42 medals including 9 gold, 19 silver and 14 bronze and finished 21st in the medal table.

Medalists

Medals by sports

Gold medals

Silver medals

Bronze medals

Multi-Medallists

See also 
 Italy at the Paralympics
 Italy at the 1984 Summer Olympics

References 

1984
1984 in Italian sport
Nations at the 1984 Summer Paralympics